Myopites apicatus is a species of tephritid or fruit flies in the family Tephritidae.

Distribution
France, Austria, Slovakia, Hungary, Italy, Greece (Crete), Turkey, Israel.

References

Tephritinae
Myopites
Insects described in 1980
Diptera of Europe